Reyes Abades (25 July 1949 – 1 February 2018) was a Spanish specialist in special effects. He won nine Goya Awards. Abades worked on more than 300 productions. He contributed to the opening and closing ceremonies for the 1992 Summer Olympics in Barcelona. He died of a heart attack at age 68.

Partial filmography
 ¡Ay, Carmela! (1990)
 Beltenebros (1991)
 Días contados (1994)
 Tierra (1995)
 El día de la bestia (1995)
 Abre los ojos (1997)
 Buñuel y la mesa del rey Salomón (2001)
 El lobo (2004)
 Alatriste (2006)
 El laberinto del fauno (2006)
 Los abrazos rotos (2009)
 El cónsul de Sodoma (2009)
 Balada triste de trompeta (2010)

References

External links
 

1949 births
2018 deaths
Special effects people
People from the Province of Badajoz